Okitū is a suburb and coastal settlement of Gisborne, in the Gisborne District of New Zealand's North Island. It is located north east of Wainui Beach.

The name was officially modified to include a macron in 2021.

Demographics
Okitū is in five SA1 statistical areas which cover . The SA1 areas are part of the Wainui-Okitu statistical area.

Okitū had a population of 666 at the 2018 New Zealand census, an increase of 27 people (4.2%) since the 2013 census, and an increase of 27 people (4.2%) since the 2006 census. There were 255 households, comprising 336 males and 336 females, giving a sex ratio of 1.0 males per female, with 150 people (22.5%) aged under 15 years, 75 (11.3%) aged 15 to 29, 354 (53.2%) aged 30 to 64, and 84 (12.6%) aged 65 or older.

Ethnicities were 86.5% European/Pākehā, 24.3% Māori, 1.4% Pacific peoples, 2.7% Asian, and 4.1% other ethnicities. People may identify with more than one ethnicity.

Although some people chose not to answer the census's question about religious affiliation, 53.2% had no religion, 35.1% were Christian, 0.9% had Māori religious beliefs, 0.5% were Hindu and 3.2% had other religions.

Of those at least 15 years old, 195 (37.8%) people had a bachelor's or higher degree, and 39 (7.6%) people had no formal qualifications. 138 people (26.7%) earned over $70,000 compared to 17.2% nationally. The employment status of those at least 15 was that 288 (55.8%) people were employed full-time, 93 (18.0%) were part-time, and 12 (2.3%) were unemployed.

Parks

Okitu Bush Scenic Reserve is a local conservation reserve and walking, owned and operated by the Department of Conservation.

Makorori Headland is a local walkway and cycleway, owned and operated by Gisborne District Council.

References

Suburbs of Gisborne, New Zealand